Wang Krachae is a village and tambon (subdistrict) of Sai Yok District, in Kanchanaburi Province, Thailand. In 2016 it had a population of 9,134 people. The tambon contains nine villages.

Wang Krachae Subdistrict is in the mountainous area of the Tenasserim Hills, close to the border with Myanmar.

History
In 2015 sound from the meteor was reported in three districts of Kanchanaburi Province: Thong Pha Phum, Sai Yok and Si Sawat. The Governor of Kanchanaburi Province, Wan-chai Osukhonthip, ordered police and Sai Yok National Park rangers to search Wang Krachae and Bong Ti subdistricts in Sai Yok District for meteor debris.

References

External links 

Map of the area

Tambon of Kanchanaburi Province
Populated places in Kanchanaburi province
Myanmar–Thailand border
Tenasserim Hills